Giannis Simosis (born 13 March 1991) is a Greek footballer who most recently played for Adelaide Olympic as a striker.

References

External links
 
Myplayer.gr Profile

1991 births
Living people
People from Euboea (regional unit)
Greek footballers
Greek expatriate footballers
Association football forwards
Super League Greece players
Panionios F.C. players
Panthrakikos F.C. players
A.O. Kerkyra players
SV Wacker Burghausen players
Anagennisi Karditsa F.C. players
3. Liga players
National Premier Leagues players
Footballers from Central Greece